Sycosaurus is an extinct genus of rubidgeine gorgonopsians from the Usili Formation (Songea Group) of Tanzania. It was medium-sized, about 1.2 m in length. It was first named by Haughton in 1924, and contains two species, S. laticeps and S. nowaki.

References 

Gorgonopsia
Prehistoric therapsid genera
Permian synapsids of Africa
Fossils of Tanzania
Fossil taxa described in 1924
Taxa named by Friedrich von Huene